The Chrysler Horizon is a compact hatchback that was designed by Chrysler Europe and was produced from 1978 to 1987 under the Chrysler, Simca and Talbot nameplates.  The successor to both the Simca 1100 and Hillman Avenger, the Horizon adopted a front-wheel drive, transverse-engine layout.  

The model line was the first (and only) world car developed by Chrysler Corporation, who developed the American-market Dodge Omni/Plymouth Horizon in tandem, following the start of the Chrysler Europe project.  While similar in appearance (for the Plymouth brand, sharing a nameplate), the Horizon would have substantial functional differences from its American counterpart.  

Following the 1978 sale of Chrysler Europe to Peugeot, the Horizon was rebranded under the revived Talbot marque from 1979 onward.  Alongside assembly in Chrysler Europe (later Peugeot) facilities in France and the United Kingdom, the Horizon was assembled by Saab in Finland and by Peugeot-Talbot in Spain.

Origins
The Horizon was developed by Chrysler Europe under the codename C2. It was designed in the United Kingdom at the Whitley design studio by Roy Axe and engineered in France at Poissy by Simca as a replacement for their ageing 1100 range. It was introduced to market in summer 1978. In France it was initially sold under the Simca brand, whilst elsewhere in Europe it was initially badged as a Chrysler. As a result of the acquisition of Chrysler's European car division by Peugeot in 1978, both the Chrysler and Simca brands were dropped and the car was then sold under the Talbot brand in all its European markets.

The Horizon was intended to be a "world car", meaning that it was designed for consumers on both sides of the Atlantic, but in execution, the European and North American versions of the vehicle actually turned out to have very little in common. Born largely out of the need to replace the ageing Simca 1100 in France, the Horizon was essentially a shortened version of the larger Alpine model, giving the vehicle an unusually wide track for its length. Featuring "Poissy engine" of transversely mounted, Simca-designed 1.1, 1.3 and 1.5-litre OHV engines, 4-speed gearbox and torsion-bar suspension, the Horizon gained praise for its crisp styling, supple ride, and competent handling.

The SX version which joined the range for the Paris Motor Show, in October 1978, attracted much interest on account of its innovative trip computer. The device took information from three sources, a clock, a "débitmètre" mounted on the fuel feed to the carburetor and a distance information from the feed for the odometer. Using these three pieces of information the "computer" was able to report current fuel consumption and average speeds as well as information on distances and times, in either metric or imperial units. The trip computer later became an option on lesser models such as the GLS.

The Horizon was voted European Car of the Year in 1979. Initially only available in LS or GL trim, its launch saw the end of the rear-engined Simca 1000. The Simca 1100 remained in production in France until 1981, being sold for a time as a low cost alternative to the Horizon, but the two cars competed in virtually the same segment and the older car, its model range drastically reduced, saw its sales plummet. On the British market, the rear-wheel drive Avenger saloons and estates remained in production alongside it, giving British buyers a full choice of bodystyles in a market where hatchbacks still only accounted for a minority of sales. There was never a three-door version of the Horizon. To fulfill this need, the Simca 1100 remained on sale in continental Europe, while the rear-wheel drive Chrysler Sunbeam was sold alongside the Horizon in the United Kingdom until 1981.

Although it didn't officially replace any of the British Chryslers – despite being a similar size to the rear-wheel drive Sunbeam and traditional Hillman Avenger saloon and estates which had been on sale since 1970 – both of the latter finished production in 1981.

Production life
After Chrysler Europe collapsed in 1978 and was sold to Peugeot, the Horizon was rebadged as a Talbot in 1979.

In 1981, the revisited models were introduced with minor improvements. By then however, the Horizon was becoming increasingly uncompetitive next to rivals such as the Volkswagen Golf (which was actually four years older), Opel Kadett/Vauxhall Astra and the third generation Ford Escort. The unrefined overhead-valve engines which had been carried over from the Simca 1100 were largely to blame, while body corrosion was a serious issue – at least until the Series II – giving many cars a short service life.

The series 2 Horizon launched in July 1982 had a 5-speed gearbox, and badged series II 5 speed. The bumpers were painted black and the rear windscreen was smaller, because the parcel shelf was raised to increase the size of the boot. Some models had an electronic LED 'econometer' which lit up several lights around the edge of the speedometer dial. There was also an LED tachometer on the top of the range models; this was a horizontal row of green, yellow, and red LEDs positioned atop the steering column. These lit up in 250 rpm intervals.

The Horizon was then updated in 1985, with different interior trim again slight changes to instrument dials and door cards were to make the car look more modern, but along with the Fiat Ritmo/Strada, it was now the oldest mainstream family hatchback on sale in Europe, and was now faced with competition from even more new competitors.

Fewer paint colours were available and fewer models. Many of the late cars, which were built between 1985 and 1986, were painted in an unsympathetic pale green or cream. Horizons had initially been available in more adventurous colours including orange, but many of these colours had gone out of fashion after the 1970s.

A Talbot Horizon turbo concept car was produced in 1984 with a full cream leather interior and sporty body kit, the car was designed at Whitley, Coventry. The Turbo Horizon is very different from those models once seen out on the street and is kept at Coventry Transport Museum, Coventry England.

Due to corrosion problems the Horizon is now a rare sight, with just 20 examples still on the road in the UK at the end of 2016.

The main production lines of Horizon were Poissy in France and PSA Ryton Assembly in England. British manufacture commenced on 4 January 1982 and soon thereafter the Ryton plant was working a full five-day week for the first time in sixteen months. At the time, British Horizons had 60 percent British parts content. It was also manufactured in Spain in Villaverde by PSA Peugeot Citroën's Spanish subsidiary and also in Finland by Saab-Valmet from 1979 onwards. The Finnish-made Talbot Horizons integrated many Saab components, especially in the interior and electrical system. The Saab-Valmet factory also made a series of 2,385 cars that ran on kerosene or turpentine.

The Horizon was produced in France and also Britain (where production had begun in the 1980s) until June 1986, and in Spain and Finland until 1987. Its successor was the Peugeot 309, a car developed in the UK and launched towards the end of 1985, originally destined to be sold as the Talbot Arizona. The end of Horizon production early in 1987 also marked the end of the Talbot badge on passenger cars. However, the North American version of the car continued to be produced until 1990.

The PSA XUD9 diesel engine of 1905 cc diesel engine was fitted to certain models of the Horizon, which was the first example of this engine available in the UK. All UK-market diesel Horizons were made in Spain. The British Peugeot-Talbot brochure of October 1984 shows the only diesel Horizon being the LD 1.9, the XUD9 engine only available in the Peugeot 305 GRD as well. The Horizon was not the first diesel in the Talbot family of cars with the Chrysler 180 in Spain having been available with diesel power during the 1970s.

The Peugeot 309 made use some of the Horizon range of Simca-based engines for most of its production life, until replaced with the more modern Peugeot TU engine in 1992.

Horizon in the UK
In Britain, it was seen as a modern alternative to the existing Rootes-designed Avenger models, offering buyers a front-wheel drive hatchback alongside the rear-wheel drive saloons and estates. The Avenger was produced alongside it until 1981, by which time the company had come under Peugeot ownership and no new models were launched to replace it, as the front-wheel drive hatchback style was becoming more popular and Peugeot already had the similar-sized 305 saloon and estates in production.

UK sales of the Horizon (which went on sale there in early 1978 and was badged as a Chrysler until 1 August 1979, when it became a Talbot) were initially acceptable, held back by the fact that it was a French import. Sales improved as manufacture was brought to the United Kingdom in 1982. Soon thereafter, however, it started to lose sales in a segment dominated by an increasing number of newer models including the Ford Escort Mark III, Vauxhall Astra, and Austin Maestro. Foreign models like the Volkswagen Golf and Datsun Sunny were also proving popular in the early 1980s.

The last British Horizons were sold in 1986, soon after the launch of Peugeot's Ryton-built 309 which had originally been intended for sale as the Talbot Arizona, as a Talbot-branded successor to the Horizon, and went on sale in January 1986. The 309 continued the Simca heritage by using Simca-derived engines in its smaller models.

The Ryton factory remained open until December 2006.

UK Specifications range

Models
The UK Horizon was available in the following trim levels:
 1100 LE, LS, GL, GLE
 1300 LS, GL, LX, GLS
 1500 LS, GL, EX, GLS, S, SX
 1900 LD

Most models were available with 4 or 5-speed gearboxes, which were initially a carry-over of the Simca gearbox, and then later the PSA BE gearbox. Automatic transmission was available on most 1500 models, and was standard equipment on the 1500 SX model. The lowest level LE had very meagre equipment, not even being fitted with a rear parcel shelf.

Some limited editions were:

 1500 "Pullman" top of range model. This had upmarket trim and a design of alloy wheel similar to the Talbot Sunbeam Lotus and a wider tyre. The Pullman also had radio upgrade with 4 speakers, and rear seatbelts. Most had beige over brown metallic, two-tone paintwork. Around 20% of the Pullman models were two tone silver and blue.
 1300 "Summertime Special" This had red plastic trim in place of the usual black.
 1500/1300 "Ultra" (1985) an upmarket high-spec car in silver metallic, had its name 'ULTRA' on the front wings in black lettering. Ultra had grey velour interior with red piping. The Ultra had been sold in the Netherlands since 1983.
 1500 "Silver Fox" which had two tone paintwork half silver, half blue metallic.

Group B Talbot Horizon
In 1982 Talbot and Lotus Cars began work on a Group B rally car meant to succeed the Talbot Sunbeam Lotus. Based on the Talbot Horizon the car was fitted with a mid-mounted Lotus type 911 engine driving the rear wheels. The project was cancelled after two prototypes had been built. Peugeot subsequently began development of their all-wheel drive 205 T16.

North American variants

The North American versions of the Horizon were known as the Dodge Omni and Plymouth Horizon. Although they appeared to share the same external bodywork as the European Horizon (the panels were in fact not interchangeable), they were vastly different mechanically – using a larger engine (of VW, then PSA origins on the early versions, replaced by Chrysler's own 2.2L OHC "Trenton" I-4 later) and MacPherson strut suspension at the front instead of the more complex torsion bar system found in the European version. They also featured larger reinforced aluminum bumpers to comply with stricter US safety legislation. Despite the car's European origins, then Chrysler chairman Lee Iacocca played this down, emphasizing that features such as the trip computer and electronic ignition were of American design.

In the US, many variants were eventually produced, including three-door coupé versions ("Charger" and "TC-3 / Turismo"), econo versions ("America", "Miser"), and powered-up versions such as the GLH, GLH Turbo, and Shelby GLHS (turbocharged, intercooled, 174 bhp). Even a small pickup truck was based on the Horizon ("Scamp" and "Rampage"). Some of these cars had successful careers in racing venues such as Auto-X, road and endurance racing, and pro rallying.

References

External links 

 The Chrysler Horizon and Simca 1100
 Chrysler Horizon cars
 Simca Matra Talbot Club UK.
 The website of the Simca-Talbot Horizon 
 Talbot Horizon in Finland by Saab-Valmet

Horizon
Front-wheel-drive vehicles
Subcompact cars
Hatchbacks
1980s cars
Cars introduced in 1978